Dzerzhinsk is a city in Nizhny Novgorod Oblast, Russia, located along the Oka River, about  east of Moscow and  west of Nizhny Novgorod. Population: 

It was previously known as Rastyapino (until 1929).

History
First mentioned in 1606 as Rastyapino, it is named after Felix Dzerzhinsky, a Bolshevik leader who was the first head of the Soviet Cheka (secret police), from 1929.

Administrative and municipal status
Within the framework of administrative divisions, it is, together with three work settlements and eleven rural localities, incorporated as the city of oblast significance of Dzerzhinsk—an administrative unit with a status equal to that of the districts. As a municipal division, the city of oblast significance of Dzerzhinsk is incorporated as Dzerzhinsk Urban Okrug.

Chemical weapons and other production

Modern-day Dzerzhinsk is a large center of the Russian chemicals production industry. In the past, the city was also among Russia's principal production sites for chemical weapons. Owing to its strategic significance, this city was, until recently, officially closed to foreign visitors.

Manufacture of various chemical weapons started in 1941, particularly concentrating on the production of lewisite—the poisonous effects of which are owed to its arsenic trioxide content—and yperite (mustard gas). The factory producing these substances was called the Kaprolactam (or Caprolaktam) Organic Glass Factory, and in addition to its arsenic-based weapons, also produced prussic acid and phosgene.

Chemical weapons production at Dzerzhinsk ceased in 1965. Some materials were transferred to storage units, while large amounts of waste material—frequently containing high concentrations of arsenic—were buried in dumps on the site of the factory. Full dismantling of the yperite facility was commenced in 1994. As of 1998, the lewisite production unit was still not completely disassembled.

, Dzerzhinsk had 38 large industrial enterprises, which export their goods worldwide. About one thousand varieties of chemical products are produced in Dzerzhinsk. The largest factories, which exist  or existed in the past, include:
Sverdlov Plant, FSE (Federal State Enterprise) manufactures munitions, battle and industrial explosives, and chemicals for industrial purposes (phenol-formaldehyde resin, epoxy resin, carbamide-furane resin, plasticizers, hardeners of various modifications, nitrobenzene, sulphanole, acetic anhydride, various cleaners and detergents, as well as other products). The plant is included in the presidential list of the country's strategic enterprises. This is Dzerzhinsk's largest factory.
 JSC Kristall Research Institute, a military explosives factory, part of the Sverdlow Plant, which suffered a serious explosion in June 2019.
Korund, JSC (opened in 1915, the first factory in Russia to produce cyanide, still operational). This plant produces corundum for lasers and other applications. It is the oldest enterprise in Dzerzhinsk. In 2004, the plant was temporarily closed due to bankruptcy.
Dzerzhinskhimmash, JSC (opened in 1941, currently (2013) makes distillation and сolumn equipment, evaporators, heat exchangers).
Sintez, JSC. Produces acetone, carbonyl iron, diethanolamine, isopropanol, methylamine, phenol, etc.
Orgsteklo, JSC (previously manufactured specialist glass for the aeronautics market, currently (in 2012?) specializes in production of acrylic co-polymers and organic glasses).
Avangard-KNAUF, JSC
Liebherr, JSC
Plastik, JSC
Aviabor, JSC
SIBUR-Neftekhim, JSC
Oka, Yava, Orgsitilen, Zarya (no longer functioning).

Pollution
According to the September 12, 2007, study by the Blacksmith Institute, Dzerzhinsk is one of the worst-polluted cities of the world and has a life expectancy of 42 years for men and 47 for women, with the 2003 death rate exceeding its birth rate by 260%. Environmental action groups such as Greenpeace attribute such low life expectancy to high levels of persistent organic chemicals, particularly dioxins.  The Blacksmith Institute also names sarin, lewisite, sulfur mustard, hydrogen cyanide, phosgene, lead, and organic chemicals among the worst pollutants.  Parts of Dzerzhinsk's water are contaminated with dioxins and phenol at levels that are reportedly seventeen million times the safe limit.

Dzerzhinsk's environmental agency estimates that almost 300,000 tons of chemical waste were dumped in the city between 1930 and 1998. The Ecology Committee of the Russian State Duma also considers Dzerzhinsk among the top ten cities with disastrous ecological conditions.

Dzerzhinsk's City Administration, however, asserts that the Blacksmith Institute report is false, stating, for example, that since sarin had never been produced in the city (seems to be credible according to Fedorov, p262, Table 7.1), it cannot be one of the major pollutants. Also, according to the city's health department, the average life expectancy in the city was 64 years in 2006. Askhat Kayumkov, the head of the Dront public ecological organization, which was quoted as a source by the Blacksmith Institute, states that his organization never provided the Blacksmith Institute with data of any kind. Furthermore, he does not believe that Dzerzhinsk is one of the most polluted cities in Russia, much less in the whole world.

In the end, however, despite the ecological situation in the city being at its best in the previous 80 years (mostly due to bankruptcies and closures of the polluting factories), several locations in the city pose a tangible ecological risk. These sites include the 110ha Igumnovo landfill, toxic waste burial grounds, and a so-called "White Sea", composed of disposed chemical wastes. These sites are kept under constant ecological monitoring.

In June 2019 a massive explosion at JSC Kristall Research Institute injured 79 people and destroyed 180 homes in the neighbourhood.

After unsuccessful tenders in 2012-13, GazEnergoStroy was selected for cleanup in 2016. The liquidation of "Black Hole" started and waste burning infrastructure was completed by 2019. According to sources  the amount of waste is 57% more than expected, and the clean up might only finish in autumn of 2021 with an extra 238 million rubles from the central government, but the request was denied. According to local newspaper  the equipment downtime is 49% and further delay is expected.
Reclamation works on "White Sea" and Igumnovo were ongoing in 2019  by GazEnergoStroy.

Sights

Shukhov Tower on the Oka River, the unique architectural construction—the  steel lattice hyperboloid tower built by Soviet engineer and scientist Vladimir Shukhov in 1929—is located near Dzerzhinsk on the left bank of the Oka River. There used to be two towers, but one was stolen for scrap metal in 2005.

Notable people
 
 
Sergey Chigrakov, rock performer and songwriter
Aleksandr Demenshin, former Russian professional football player
Eduard Limonov, writer and politician
Natali, pop singer and songwriter
Irina Voronina, Playboy playmate

International relations

Twin towns and sister cities
Dzerzhinsk is twinned with:
  Bitterfeld-Wolfen, Germany since 1996
  Grodno, Belarus since 2005
  Druskininkai, Lithuania since 2009
  Zelenodolsk, Russia since 2011

References

Notes

Sources

External links

Official website of Dzerzhinsk 
Dzerzhinsk Business Directory 

Cities and towns in Nizhny Novgorod Oblast
Dzerzhinsk Urban Okrug
Cities and towns built in the Soviet Union
Populated places established in 1929